The governors of the states of Mexico are the first-level administrative divisions of Mexico. There are 31 states and one federal entity in Mexico. The lists include current governors, female governors, and governors of each state.

General
 List of current state governors in Mexico
 List of female state governors in Mexico

By state

 Governor of Aguascalientes
 Governor of Baja California
 Governor of Baja California Sur
 Governor of Campeche
 Governor of Chiapas
 Governor of Chihuahua
 Governor of Coahuila
 Governor of Colima
 Governor of Durango
 Governor of Guanajuato
 Governor of Guerrero
 List of Governors of Hidalgo 
 Governor of Jalisco
 Governor of the State of Mexico
 Governor of Michoacán
 Governor of Morelos
 Governor of Nayarit
 Governor of Nuevo León
 Governor of Oaxaca
 Governor of Puebla
 Governor of Querétaro
 Governor of Quintana Roo
 Governor of San Luis Potosí
 Governor of Sinaloa
 Governor of Sonora
 Governor of Tabasco
 Governor of Tamaulipas
 Governor of Tlaxcala
 Governor of Veracruz
 Governor of Yucatán
 Governor of Zacatecas